Carlos Alonso (born 1929) is an Argentine painter.

Carlos Alonso may also refer to:

 Carlos Martínez Alonso (born 1950), State Secretary for Research in the Spanish Ministry for Science and Innovation
 Carlos Alonso Bazalar (born 1990), Peruvian footballer
 Carlos Alonso Gonzalez, "Santillana" (born 1952), Spanish footballer
 Carlos Alonso Kali (born 1978), Angolan footballer
 Carlos Alonso (Nicaraguan footballer) (born 1979), Nicaraguan footballer